Ivan "Ivo" Visin (3 November 1806 – 17 August 1868) was a naval captain of the Austro-Hungarian Navy and an explorer.

Biography
Visin was born in Prčanj, then under the occupation of the French Empire. At the request of the government of the Habsburg monarchy, he became the first Croat to circumnavigate the globe in a vessel called Splendido between 1852 and 1859. The journey started in Antwerp and ended successfully in Trieste. The ship was 30 m long with 311 tonnes of cargo. For this undertaking of historical importance for the empire, he had been decorated with a flag of honour Merito navali by the Austrian Emperor Franz Josef. The trophy is on display in Birth of Our Lady church in Prčanj. Later, Visin became an honorary citizen of Trieste.

References

1806 births
1868 deaths
Croats of Montenegro
People from Prčanj
Croatian explorers
Montenegrin explorers
Circumnavigators of the globe
Recipients of the Order of Franz Joseph